Khitrov or Khytrov (Хитров in Russian, Ukrainian and Bulgarian, from хитрый = cunning) is a Slavic male surname, its feminine counterpart is Khitrova or Khytrova. It may refer to
Evhen Khytrov (born 1988), Ukrainian boxer
Valery Khitrov (born 1941), Russian cyclist
Galina Khitrova (1959–2016), Russian-American physicist
Irina Khitrova (born 1953), Bulgarian Olympic gymnast

See also
Khitruk
Khitrovka

Bulgarian-language surnames